The Grande Hotel of Ouro Preto (Portuguese: Grande Hotel de Ouro Preto) is a hotel in  Ouro Preto, Minas Gerais, Brazil. Constructed in 1940, it is one of the early works of the architect Oscar Niemeyer (1907–2012). The Serviço do Patrimônio Histórico e Artístico (SPHAN), the precursor to the Brazilian National Institute of Historic and Artistic Heritage, designated the city of Ouro Preto as a historic site and domestic tourist destination. SPHAN, in consultation with the architect Lúcio Costa, commissioned the construction of a modern hotel in the city. Niemeyer's design was chosen over that of Carlos Leão (1906-1983).

References

Modernist architecture in Brazil
Oscar Niemeyer buildings
Hotel buildings completed in 1940
Tourist attractions in Minas Gerais
Buildings and structures in Minas Gerais